Peragrarchis pelograpta is a moth in the family Carposinidae. It is found on the Austral Islands.

References

Natural History Museum Lepidoptera generic names catalog

Carposinidae
Moths described in 1929